The 2013-14 season, is the 29º Primera B Metropolitana season since it became part of the third tier of the Argentine football league system. The tournament is reserved for teams directly affiliated to the Asociación del Fútbol Argentino (AFA), while teams affiliated to AFA through local leagues (known as "indirectly affiliated to AFA") have to play the Torneo Federal A, which is the other third tier competition. For this season, AFA decided to change the structure in the Argentine football league system, and exceptionally 3 teams will  be promoted to the next season of Primera B Nacional and there will be no relegations for this season. A total of 22 teams competed.

Competition format

The tournament is composed of 22 teams playing in two zones on a double round-robin format, each team then playing a total of 20 matches. Three points are awarded for a win, one for a draw and none for a loss. The team of each zone with more points is automatically promoted to the Primera B Nacional. Teams positioned 2nd to 4th qualify for the Torneo Reducido, which will be played on a, home and away, knock-out system, the winner of the final is then promoted to the Primera B Nacional. If the playoff ends in a draw, there is a penalty shoot-out to determine a winner.
For this season exceptionally there will be no relegation.

Teams

Standings

Zone 1

Results

Zone 2

Results

Relegation
This season there will be no relegations. The points obtained will be added for the next season.

Torneo Reducido

Quarterfinals

Semifinals

Final

External links
List of Argentine second division champions by RSSSF

3
Primera B Metropolitana seasons